Lost Creek Lake is a reservoir located on the Rogue River in Jackson County, Oregon, United States. The lake is impounded by William L. Jess Dam which was constructed by the U.S. Army Corps of Engineers in 1977 for flood control and fisheries enhancement. The lake and dam were the first completed elements of the multi-purpose Rogue River Basin Project, consisting of Lost Creek Lake, Applegate Lake and the Elk Creek project.

History
Construction of Lost Creek Dam began in 1972 and was completed in 1977. In 1996, the Congress renamed Lost Creek Dam, along with the adjoining intake structure, in honor of William L. Jess, one of the founders of the Rogue Basin Association, which was established in 1955. Jess was a strong advocate for the construction and multiple use of the impounded waters.

The primary purpose of the dam is flood control and is operated in conjunction with Applegate Dam to regulate water flows down the river as well as to impound water for summer use. The dam is an earthfill structure with a gated spillway and contains two hydroelectric generating units with a total capacity of 49 megawatts. The technologically advanced and unusual intake tower regulates water temperature by combining lake water from different depths in a mixing chamber before releasing it downstream. This serves to cool the normally warm summer water of the Rogue River, which improves conditions for fish migration and survival. Joseph H. Stewart State Recreation Area is located along the southern shore of the lake. Casey State Park is located on the Rogue River below the dam.

Recreation
Lost Creek Lake is located 37 miles northeast of Medford, OR, off of highway 62. The lake has been a popular recreational site for southern Oregonians since its construction in the 70's. Outdoor enthusiasts of all kinds find amusement in the lake and on its surrounding land. With average rainfall the lake is around 3,430 acres and 280 feet in depth, providing plenty of area for summertime watersports such as boating, skiing, wake boarding, tubing, and jet-skiing. The Lost Creek Lake is a popular year round spot for trout and small mouth bass fishing. A 20-mile trail along the lakeshore can be used by hikers or mountain bikers. This trail runs through the Joseph H. Stewart State Park, which is a popular camping destination, offering 150+ sites with electrical hookups for RVs and Campers, as well as 50 tent sites with water. Public bathrooms and showers are also available in the campground, as well as a RV dump station. Two boat landings are located off of the lakes shores, one of which is part of the Joseph H. Stewart State Park. The state park boat landing is located next to the Lost Creek Marina. In addition to boat storage and rentals, the marina features on water fueling, a bait and tackle shop, and a small store and restaurant.

Applicable fishing regulations and information can be found at the Oregon Department of Fish and Wildlife website.

Photo gallery

Fish hatchery
Cole Rivers Hatchery is located on the Rogue River, 30 miles northeast of Medford, Oregon, on Highway 62, about 1⁄2 mile downstream of Lost Creek Dam.

The US Army Corps of Engineers constructed the hatchery in 1973 to mitigate impacts to salmon spawning and rearing areas blocked by the construction of the Lost Creek, Applegate, and Elk Creek Dams (the latter was never constructed). The Hatchery was named in honor of Cole M. Rivers, a biologist on the Rogue River for 20 years. The facility is used for adult collection, spawning, egg incubation and rearing of spring chinook, coho, summer steelhead, and winter steelhead, and egg incubation and rearing of fall chinook and rainbow trout.

See also 

 List of lakes in Oregon

References

External links
U.S. Army Corps of Engineers: Corps Lake Gateway – Lost Creek Lake
U.S. Army Corps of Engineers: Lost Creek Lake
Recreation.gov: Lost Creek Lake
Rogue-Umpqua Scenic Byway

U.S. Army Corps of Engineers: Lost Creek Dam and Lake Water Management data
Bonneville Power Administration: Dams photo gallery

Reservoirs in Oregon
Rogue River (Oregon)
Rivers of Jackson County, Oregon
Protected areas of Jackson County, Oregon
1977 establishments in Oregon